The Amusement Trades Exhibition International (ATEI) is the major UK trade show for the coin-op and amusements trade.

See also 
 BACTA (British Amusement Caterers Trade Association)
 Coinslot

References

External links 
 ATEI homepage

Trade fairs in the United Kingdom